Dystovomita is a genus of flowering plants belonging to the family Clusiaceae.

Its native range is Central and Southern Tropical America.

Species:

Dystovomita clusiifolia 
Dystovomita paniculata

References

Clusiaceae
Malpighiales genera